Stelsi is a Ukrainian electro-folk/synthpop/electronic dance music group, founded in 1999 by Alex Kukharsky in Chernivtsy, Bukovina. The band have been credited as one of the first electronic music acts in Ukraine, with a fusion of styles that quickly grew into mainstream popularity at the beginning of the 2000s. During its more-than-decade history, band`s sound developed rapidly from big-beat, techno, house & other club-oriented genres (2000-2003) up to more live performance synthpop\alternative\rock music (2003-2005), finally incorporating ethnic\folk elements which resulted in a unique style fusion that was called "electro-folk" by critics and press (2005–present). The band`s music can be frequently heard in commercials, radio & TV shows, presentations, sport events and other popular media throughout Ukraine.

Members 

 Alex Kukharsky - vocals, lyrics, synth, keyboards, producer
 Aleksandr “Gunya” Vereninov - guitar, lyrics
 Mykola “Sniper” Kobyliuk - synth, keyboards, sampling, backing vocals, lyrics
 Serhiy Palka - Bass, backing vocals

Discography

Albums 
 Total Synth-ethics (Суцільна Синт-етика) (2001)
 Sunrise (Сонцесхід) (2002)
 Model (Модель) (EP) (2003)
 Aliens (2004)
 Tam... (Там...) (2005)
 Unlimited Unreliability Company (Товариство з безмежною безвідповідальністю) (2008)

References

External links 
 Official website (in Ukrainian)
 Stelsi on Facebook

Ukrainian musical groups